Pixar RenderMan (formerly PhotoRealistic RenderMan) is proprietary photorealistic 3D rendering software produced by Pixar Animation Studios. Pixar uses RenderMan to render their in-house 3D animated movie productions and it is also available as a commercial product licensed to third parties. In 2015, a free non-commercial version of RenderMan became available.

Name
To speed up rendering, Pixar engineers performed experiments with parallel rendering computers using Transputer chips inside a Pixar Image Computer. The name comes from the nickname of a small circuit board (2.5 × 5 inches or 6.4 × 13 cm) containing one Transputer that engineer Jeff Mock could put in his pocket. During that time the Sony Walkman was very popular and Jeff Mock called his portable board Renderman, leading to the software name.

Technology
RenderMan defines cameras, geometry, materials, and lights using the RenderMan Interface Specification. This specification facilitates communication between 3D modeling and animation applications and the render engine that generates the final high quality images. In the past RenderMan used the Reyes Rendering Architecture. The Renderman standard was first presented at 1993 SIGGRAPH, developed with input from 19 companies and 6 or 7 big partners, with Pat Hanrahan taking a leading role. Ed Catmull said no software product met the RenderMan Standard in 1993. RenderMan met it after about two years.

Additionally RenderMan supports Open Shading Language to define textural patterns.

When Pixar started development, Steve Jobs described the original goal for RenderMan in 1991:
During this time, Pixar used the C language for developing Renderman, which allowed them to port it to many platforms.

Historically, RenderMan used the Reyes algorithm to render images with added support for advanced effects such as ray tracing and global illumination. Support for Reyes rendering and the RenderMan Shading Language were removed from RenderMan in 2016.

RenderMan currently uses Monte Carlo path tracing to generate images.

Awards
RenderMan has been used to create digital visual effects for Hollywood blockbuster movies such as Beauty and the Beast, Aladdin, The Lion King, Terminator 2: Judgment Day, Toy Story, Jurassic Park, Avatar, Titanic, the Star Wars prequels, and The Lord of the Rings. RenderMan has received four Academy Scientific and Technical Awards. The first was in 1993 honoring Pat Hanrahan, Anthony A. Apodaca, Loren Carpenter, Rob Cook, Ed Catmull, Darwyn Peachey, and Tom Porter. The second was as part of the 73rd Scientific and Technical Academy Awards ceremony presentation on March 3, 2001: the Academy of Motion Picture Arts and Sciences' Board of Governors honored Ed Catmull, Loren Carpenter and Rob Cook with an Academy Award of Merit "for significant advancements to the field of motion picture rendering as exemplified in Pixar’s RenderMan". The third was in 2010 honoring "Per Christensen, Christophe Hery, and Michael Bunnell for the development of point-based rendering for indirect illumination and ambient occlusion." The fourth was in 2011 honoring David Laur. It has also won the Gordon E. Sawyer Award in 2009 and The Coons Award. It is the first software product awarded an Oscar.

See also
List of 3D rendering software

References

External links

3D computer graphics software for Linux
3D graphics software
IRIX software
Pixar
Proprietary commercial software for Linux
Rendering systems
RenderMan
3D rendering software for Linux